The 4th constituency of Békés County is one of the single member constituencies of the National Assembly, the national legislature of Hungary. The constituency standard abbreviation: Békés 04. OEVK.

Since 2022, it has been represented by Norbert Erdős of the Fidesz–KDNP party alliance.

Geography
The 4th constituency is located in southern part of Békés County.

List of municipalities
The constituency includes the following municipalities:

History
The 4th constituency of Békés County was created in 2011 and contained of the pre-2011 abolished constituencies of 6th, 7th and part of 2nd constituency of this County. Its borders have not changed since its creation.

Members
The constituency was first represented by György Simonka of the Fidesz from 2014 to 2022. He was succeeded by Norbert Erdős of the Fidesz in 2022.

References

Békés 4th